Diamond Peak is a ski resort in the western United States, located in Incline Village, Nevada. Near the northeast shore of Lake Tahoe, the resort has 6 chairlifts, 30 runs, open glades, and tree skiing on its  of terrain.

Lifts include the "Lakeview Quad" which features a view of Lake Tahoe during the lift's ascent.

Lifts
Diamond Peak has six chairlifts:
Lakeview Quad (launchpad)
School House
Red Fox
Ridge
Lodgepole Quad (launchpad)
Crystal Express
 Other

History
Oklahoman entrepreneur Art Wood and his associate Harold Tiller envisioned the idea for the resort which was then known as "Ski Incline", and was developed to reality in 1966 by Luggi Foeger, a famous Austrian ski resort consultant whom Wood hired to design and build the resort. It has long since expanded and grown since its debut  in November 1966.

See also
Skiing
List of ski areas and resorts in the United States

External links

Ski areas and resorts in Nevada
Buildings and structures in Washoe County, Nevada
Tourist attractions in Washoe County, Nevada